St Mary with St Alban is the Church of England parish church of Teddington in the London Borough of Richmond upon Thames. It comprises the church of St Mary (Teddington's old parish church) and the former church of St Alban nearby. The vicar is the Reverend Joe Moffatt.

The church building, which has been Grade II* listed since 1952, is located on Ferry Road in Teddington, opposite the former St Alban's Church, which is now an arts centre. The oldest parts of the building date from the 16th century. 

The church's most famous vicar was the Reverend Stephen Hales, a scientist whose legacy is the nearby National Physical Laboratory; he is buried next to the church's tower.

Notable burials
 Sir Orlando Bridgeman, 1st Baronet (1606–1674) was an English common law jurist, lawyer, and politician who sat in the House of Commons from 1640 to 1642. He supported the Royalist cause in the Civil War.
 Rear-Admiral Valentine Collard (c. 1770–1846), served in the French Revolutionary and Napoleonic Wars. 
 Henry Flitcroft (1697–1769), an architect who worked his way from a simple background to be Comptroller of the King's Works and worked on Wimpole Hall, Woburn Abbey, and St Giles in the Fields.
 Stephen Hales (1677–1761), clergyman who made major contributions to a range of scientific fields
 Thomas Traherne (1636 or 1637–1674), poet, Anglican cleric, theologian, and religious writer, who was buried under the church's reading desk
 John Walter (1738–1812), who founded The Times newspaper and died at The Grove, Teddington
 Paul Whitehead (1710–1774), poet and satirist, secretary to the infamous Hellfire Club, who lived at Colne Lodge, Twickenham.
 Peg Woffington (1720–1760), Irish actress and socialite

Gallery

References

External links
Official website
A Church Near You – St Mary with St Alban, Teddington

1700s establishments in England
Teddington
Churches in Teddington
Diocese of London
Grade II* listed churches in the London Borough of Richmond upon Thames
History of the London Borough of Richmond upon Thames